Temiar is a Central Aslian (Mon–Khmer) language spoken in Western Malaysia by the Temiar people.  The Temiar are one of the most numerous Aslian-speaking peoples, numbering around 30,000 in 2017.

Name
Etymologically, the word "Temiar" means "edge" or "side". This meaning reflects the way in which Temiars describe themselves as "people of the edge, outside, [i.e. jungle]."

Phonology

Vowels

Consonants

Morphosyntax

Noun Phrase

The noun phrase is (pro)noun initial followed by modifiers and demonstratives or possessor pronouns. Pronouns may not be modified by another pronoun.  There are three allomorphic classes of pronouns (stressed unstressed, and bound). Stressed third person pronouns must occur with a demonstrative (and hence only occur as unstressed or as bound morphemes on the demonstrative (e.g. na-doh 'he-here' or ʔun-tu:y 'they-elsewhere.'

Verb Phrase 
The verb phrase is ordered as sentential negation, auxiliary verb and main verb. The verb phrase precedes the subject.

Further reading
 Benjamin, Geoffrey. 1999. "Temiar kinship terminology: a linguistic and formal analysis." Occasional Paper no. 1, Malaysian Academy of Social Sciences (AKASS), Penang: AKASS Heritage Paper Series.
 Benjamin, Geoffrey. 2011. "Deponent verbs and middle-voice nouns in Temiar." In: Sophana Srichampa & Paul Sidwell (eds), Austroasiatic Studies: Papers from ICAAL4 (=Mon-Khmer Studies, Special Issue no. 2), Canberra: Pacific Linguistics E-8, pp. 11–37.  (electronic document)
 Benjamin, Geoffrey. 2012. "The peculiar history of the ethnonym 'Temiar'." Sojourn: Journal of Social Issues in Southeast Asia 27(2): 205–233.  (print),  (online) . .
 Benjamin, Geoffrey. 2012. "The Temiar causative (and related features)." Mon-Khmer Studies 41: 32–45.  (online).
 Benjamin, Geoffrey. 2014. "Aesthetic elements in Temiar grammar." In: Jeffrey Williams (ed.), The Aesthetics of Grammar: Sound and Meaning in the Languages of Mainland Southeast Asia, Cambridge: Cambridge University Press, pp. 36–60.  (print, hard cover),  (eBook, 2013). 
Benjamin, Geoffrey. 2016. "A new outline of Temiar grammar, Part 1". dx.doi.org/10.13140/RG.2.1.3944.0403.

References

External links 
 http://projekt.ht.lu.se/rwaai RWAAI (Repository and Workspace for Austroasiatic Intangible Heritage)
 http://hdl.handle.net/10050/00-0000-0000-0003-D44A-D@view Temiar in RWAAI Digital Archive

Languages of Malaysia
Aslian languages